Mikael Wikstrand (surname also spelled Vikstrand; born 5 November 1993) is a Swedish professional ice hockey defenceman who is currently playing with Färjestad BK in the Swedish Hockey League (SHL).

Playing career
In 2010–11, Wikstrand made his debut in professional hockey, playing 28 games for Mora IK of the HockeyAllsvenskan, getting one assist. The following year, Wikstrand played 47 games for the club, getting 3 points.

Wikstrand was ranked 23rd amongst European skaters in the 2012 NHL Central Scouting Bureau’s final rankings, however he was selected in the seventh round of the 2012 NHL Entry Draft by the Senators, 196th overall.

In 2012–13, Wikstrand played 45 games for Mora, getting 22 points. That year, he tied for fifth among Allsvenskan defensemen in scoring, and lead all the Mora defensemen in scoring. There were several trade rumours surrounding Wikstrand at the time, with Frölunda being particularly mentioned.

In 2014, Wikstrand signed a three-year entry-level contract with Ottawa. He attended the Ottawa Senators training camp, but played the season in Sweden with Frölunda HC on loan from Ottawa.

Wikstrand caused controversy when he abruptly left the Ottawa Senators' 2015 pre-season training camp without permission, not even notifying team officials of his departure from camp until he was at the airport about to board a flight back to his native Sweden. Senators general manager Bryan Murray announced shortly afterward that Wikstrand had been suspended by the team. Since Wikstrand is under contract with the Senators, the NHL's affiliation with the IIHF meant that he was prohibited from playing professional hockey for Färjestad BK or any other club in a league affiliated with the IIHF.

On January 20, 2016, the Ottawa Senators announced that they had come to terms with Wikstrand that would allow him to play professional hockey in his native Sweden, while the Senators retained his North American rights. Wikstrand has been loaned to Färjestad of the SHL, which will allow him to play hockey while staying close to his family home in Karlstad, where Wikstrand's brother is reportedly battling leukemia.

After Captaining Färjestad in the 2018–19 season, his fourth year with the club, Wikstrand left as a free agent in the off-season. He agreed to a two-year contract with Russian club, Ak Bars Kazan of the Kontinental Hockey League (KHL), on 13 June 2019.

At the conclusion of his contract with Ak Bars, appearing as a regular on the blueline, Wikstrand opted to return to former club, Färjestad BK, as a free agent by agreeing to a three-year contract to resume his career in the SHL on 3 May 2021.

International play

Wikstrand has represented Sweden at the 2018 Winter Olympics, the 2011 U18 World Junior Championship, as well as at the 2013 World Junior Championship, leading all Swedish defensemen with 4 points.

Career statistics

Regular season and playoffs

International

Awards and honours

References

External links

1993 births
Living people
Ak Bars Kazan players
Färjestad BK players
Frölunda HC players
Mora IK players
Ice hockey players at the 2018 Winter Olympics
Olympic ice hockey players of Sweden
Ottawa Senators draft picks
Swedish ice hockey defencemen
Sportspeople from Karlstad